Alexander Patrick Lynch (born 4 April 1995) is a Welsh football coach and former footballer who played as a goalkeeper. He is currently player/goalkeeping coach at Holyhead Hotspur.

Club career

Peterborough United
Lynch joined Peterborough United on a two-year scholarship from Welsh Alliance League side Amlwch Town in 2011. In 2013, Lynch was given a one-year professional contract and was subsequently loaned to Histon (Conference South), Stamford (Northern Premier League Premier Division) and Brackley Town (Conference North) to gain experience.

Wycombe Wanderers
In 2014, Lynch signed a two-year contract with Wycombe Wanderers after being released by Peterborough United. Lynch was loaned out to Hayes & Yeading United (Conference South) and Burnham (Southern League Premier Division) to gain further experience.

On 2 May 2015, Lynch made his professional debut as a substitute for the injured Matt Ingram in a 3–2 win against Northampton Town. Lynch continued to deputise for Ingram as Wycombe progressed from their League Two playoff semi–final against Plymouth Argyle to the 2015 League Two playoff final.

On 7 August 2015, Lynch was loaned to Conference South side Wealdstone due to an injury to Jonathan North, however he was recalled without making an appearance in the same month.
On 9 January 2016, Lynch featured in Wycombe's 1–1 draw against Aston Villa in the FA Cup 3rd round due to the suspension of Matt Ingram.

On 31 January 2018, Lynch joined Welsh Premier League side Llandudno, although he was released at the end of the season.

He was hospitalised in July 2018 whilst playing for Holyhead Hotspur.

International career
Lynch has represented Wales at under-17 and under-19 level.

Career statistics

Club

References

External links
 
 

1995 births
People from Holyhead
Sportspeople from Anglesey
Living people
Welsh footballers
Wales youth international footballers
Peterborough United F.C. players
Histon F.C. players
Stamford A.F.C. players
Brackley Town F.C. players
Wycombe Wanderers F.C. players
Hayes & Yeading United F.C. players
Burnham F.C. players
Wealdstone F.C. players
Bala Town F.C. players
Chester F.C. players
Llandudno F.C. players
Northern Football League players
English Football League players
National League (English football) players
Southern Football League players
Association football goalkeepers